W Bangkok is a five-star luxury hotel in Bangkok, marketed under the brand W Hotels.

Hotel Overview 
W Bangkok officially opened on December 7, 2012. P&T Group (Thailand), the architect, designed W Bangkok with an interior design by S.O.D.A (Thailand) and Avroko. The building contains 31 floors and 402 guest rooms. W Bangkok is located opposite the Empire Tower and the office tower. It is located on North Sathorn road.

W Bangkok is currently connected with The House on Sathorn (Sathorn Mansion), which serves as a dining and entertainment venue for the hotel.

Restaurants & Bars 
 The Kitchen Table
 WOOBAR®
 The Kitchen Pantry
 WET® Deck
 W Terrace

The House on Sathorn

The House on Sathorn was built in 1889 during the reign of King Rama V and originally owned by Luang Sathorn Rajayutka, the wealthy Chinese businessman who developed Sathorn Canal (Klong Sathorn).

In 1920s, the home was converted into The Hotel Royal. Later from 1948 to 1999, this home served as Russian embassy. In 200s, the mansion was under renovation as part of W Bangkok. In 2015, this 127-year-old mansion was officially opened as The House on Sathorn, the new dining venue in Bangkok

Restaurants & Bars

 The Dining Room
 The Bar
 The Courtyard

Awards 
BEST DESIGN HOTEL WORLDWIDE 2015 – Hotel of the Year Awards
TOP 10 HOTELS IN BANGKOK 2015 – Conde Nast Traveller Reader’s Choice Award
ASIA’S TOP DESIGN HOTEL 2015 – Now Travel Asia
BEST BAR & ENTERTAINMENT VENUE 2014 – Bangkok’s Best Restaurant Awards
CERTIFICATE OF EXCELLENCE 2014 WINNER - Tripadvisor

References

External links 
 
 The House on Sathorn Website

W Hotels
Hotels in Bangkok
Hotels established in 2012
Hotel buildings completed in 2012
Bang Rak district